Let's Rock is an MxPx compilation album of B-sides and unreleased material. "You Walk, I Run" was recorded by Jerry Finn during "the Ever Passing Moment" sessions, and "Make Up Your Mind" was also recorded by Finn and was released on "the Broken Bones" 7-inch.  Both songs appeared on the "Responsibility" Australian import.  The remaining ten tracks were previously unreleased and were self-produced.  "Sweet Sweet Thing," an acoustic version here, was originally recorded with the entire band during the "Before Everything & After" sessions with Dave Jerden, then titled "Family Affair" and featuring slightly different lyrics.  It was left off the album, although a portion of it can be heard in the album's "Before" and "After" tracks.  Music videos were made for "Breathe Deep" and "Running Out of Time."

Track listing

 "You Walk, I Run" (Re-recorded)
 "Every Light" (Unreleased)
 "1 And 3" (Unreleased) [The noise at the beginning is from 'Star Wars Episode V The Empire Strikes Back."]
 "Don't Forget Me (When You're Gone)" (Unreleased)
 "Breathe Deep" (Unreleased)
 "Make Up Your Mind" (Originally on Broken Bones 7" - Re-Recorded)
 "Running out of Time" (Unreleased)
 "Slow Ride" (Unreleased)
 "Where Did You Go?" (Unreleased)
 "Sweet Sweet Thing" (Acoustic and slightly modified rendition of rare song "Family Affair")
 "Last Train" (Acoustic - Unreleased)
 "You Walk, I Run" (Acoustic - Unreleased)

References

B-side compilation albums
MxPx compilation albums
2006 compilation albums
SideOneDummy Records compilation albums